Sleep Around may refer to:

"Sleep Around", song by Silverstein from Short Songs
"Sleep Around", song by Prince from Emancipation